Kungsör is a locality and the seat of Kungsör Municipality in Västmanland County, Sweden with 5,452 inhabitants in 2010.

Gallery

References 

Municipal seats of Västmanland County
Swedish municipal seats
Populated lakeshore places in Sweden
Populated places in Västmanland County
Populated places in Kungsör Municipality